Solnechny is a rural locality (a settlement) and the administrative center of Solnechny Selsoviet of Skovorodinsky District, Amur Oblast, Russia. The population was 341 as of 2018. There are 12 streets.

Geography 
Solnechny is located 41 km northwest of Skovorodino (the district's administrative centre) by road. BAM is the nearest rural locality.

References 

Rural localities in Skovorodinsky District